The Fort de la Montagne (also called Fort des Messieurs or Fort Belmont) was an old fortification, the remaining structures of which are located on Sherbrooke Street in Montreal, Quebec, Canada. The fort was constructed in 1685 and parts of it were demolished in the mid 19th century.

The towers were designated a National Historic Site of Canada in 1970.

History

The mission to Christianize the native people was established in 1675 at the foot of Mont-Royal mountain. François Vachon de Belmont was sent to New France towards 1680 by his superiors, order of Saint-Sulpice priests in Paris to stop the spread of witchcraft and visions at the mission. In 1683, 210 natives, (Iroquois, Hurons et Algonquins) lived on the site. In order to protect the mission from the Iroquois, a fort was constructed in 1685.

In the two decades of its existence, the brandy trade had increased significantly and the missionaries found it necessary to relocate their neophytes and catechumens farther from the drunkenness and seduction of the cities. In 1696, the inhabitants were moved to the other side of the island, to Fort Lorette at Sault-au-Recollet. The mission at de la Montagne was definitely closed in 1705: the grounds were rented to the local peasants, and some would live in the fortifications.  In 1825, a floor is added to the main residence of château des Messieurs and a chapel is built in one of the towers.

The fort contained four bastions and a series of ramparts and palisades, which were all destroyed in 1854 except for the two southern towers, during the building of the College of Montreal.

Three bastions were constructed in the domaine of the Sulpicians: the first when the bastions were built in 1675.

In 1984 to 1986, restoration work was undertaken on the two remaining towers.  The towers were classified as provincial historical monuments in 1974.  In 1982, the towers were included in the Domaine des Messieurs-de-Saint-Sulpice historic site.

Affiliations
 College of Montreal (ca 1854–1857)
 List of French forts in North America

References

1685 establishments in the French colonial empire
Buildings and structures completed in 1685
Buildings and structures in Montreal
Downtown Montreal
French colonial architecture in Canada
French forts in Canada
French forts in North America
National Historic Sites in Quebec